Andrea Sestini Hlaváčková (née Hlaváčková; ; born 10 August 1986) is a Czech retired professional tennis player.

She is a three-time Grand Slam champion in doubles, having won the 2011 French Open and 2013 US Open in women's doubles alongside Lucie Hradecká, as well as the 2013 US Open in mixed doubles with Max Mirnyi. Sestini Hlaváčková also finished runner-up in women's doubles at the Wimbledon Championships and US Open in 2012, and the Australian Open in 2016 and 2017. She reached her highest doubles ranking of world No. 3 in October 2012, and won 27 doubles titles on the WTA Tour, including the 2017 WTA Finals with Tímea Babos, and three at Premier Mandatory/Premier 5 level.

In singles, Sestini Hlaváčková reached her career-high ranking of world No. 58 in September 2012, and reached one WTA final in Gastein in 2013. Her best major singles result came at the 2012 US Open, reaching the fourth round. Sestini Hlaváčková was part of the Czech team which won the Fed Cup in 2012 and 2014, also taking part in the 2013 tournament. She also won a silver medal in doubles at the 2012 London Olympics alongside Hradecká.

Personal life
Hlaváčková married former Italian tennis player and WTA employee, Fabrizio Sestini, in July 2017. She is now competing under her new name "Andrea Sestini Hlaváčková" following the end of the 2017 season.

Her older sister, Jana Hlaváčková, was also a professional tennis player.

Tennis career
Hlaváčková started playing tennis at the age of three.

Hlaváčková was the top-ranked girls doubles player at the end of 2003. This was the last year in which there were separate junior singles and doubles rankings. Her highest girls singles ranking was No. 5, on 5 January 2004. In her U18-junior career she won three singles titles: a Grade 2 at Hostivar (September 2002), a Grade 1 at Frankfurt (June 2003), and a Grade 3 at Plzen (July 2004), and 15 doubles titles.

Hlaváčková won her first International Tennis Federation (ITF) doubles title in 2003, on 19 October, with compatriot Tereza Szafnerová. The team defeated Lucie Kriegsmannová and Pavlína Šlitrová in the final.

In May 2006, Hlaváčková won her first ITF singles title at a 25k in Tenerife, Spain, when she beat Monique Adamczak in the final. She won her first ITF doubles title of 2006 in Jersey, Channel Islands with Matea Mezak. Hlaváčková and Renata Voráčová won a title in Fontanafredda, Italy over Daniela and Sandra Klemenschits. In late 2006, she won three straight doubles events that she entered. All of them came with compatriot Nikola Franková in November and December.

In 2007, Hlaváčková won her first WTA doubles title, partnered with compatriot Petra Cetkovská. Hlaváčková and Sandra Klösel of Germany entered the 2007 Wimbledon women's doubles competition main draw as lucky losers. The team defeated Klaudia Jans and Alicja Rosolska in the first round, but fell to Michaëlla Krajicek and Agnieszka Radwańska in the second. The Czech team won the title in their home country, at the Prague Open. They defeated Ji Chunmei and Sun Shengnan. On the ITF Women's Circuit, Hlaváčková won four doubles titles. Her first of the year came in March in Tenerife, Spain, along with Margit Rüütel. Her next two titles came in La Palma, Spain and Calvià, Spain, both with Cetkovská. Hlaváčková won her fourth title with Lucie Hradecká in Jersey, Great Britain to retain her crown.

She made a successful WTA partnership with Lucie Hradecká, and teamed with her to win the 2008 ECM Prague Open in their home country. To win, the pair defeated Jill Craybas and Michaëlla Krajicek in the final. Their second title of the year then came at the 2008 Gastein Ladies, where they beat Sesil Karatantcheva and Nataša Zorić in the final.

In August 2009, Hlaváčková won her second ITF singles title at the 25k event in Bad Saulgau, Germany.

She won three 25k singles titles in 2010: in Sutton, England in February, in Les Contamines-Montjoie, France in July and in Vigo, Spain in August.

Hlaváčková won her first Grand Slam title in doubles with Hradecká at the 2011 French Open, beating Sania Mirza and Elena Vesnina in the final.
She won also two ITF singles titles in 2011: a 50k in the Bronx in August, and a 25k in Clermont-Ferrand in October.

On 5 August 2012, she won the silver medal at the London Olympics along with her women's doubles partner Hradecká.
At the US Open, she reached the fourth round. She upset Maria Kirilenko in the third round, but was defeated by fourth seed and eventual champion Serena Williams in the round of 16, 6–0, 6–0.

At the 2013 US Open, Hlaváčková won both the mixed-doubles title paired with Max Mirnyi and the women's doubles title with Lucie Hradecká.

Hlaváčková won her eighth ITF singles title (25k) in Plzen, Czech Republic in August 2015.

On 13 August 2016, at the Rio Summer Olympics, Hlaváčková's left eye was hit by a ball, from an overhead volley from Martina Hingis.

On 17 June 2022, she announced her official retirement after the 2022 Prague Open.

Performance timelines

Only main-draw results in WTA Tour, Grand Slam tournaments, Fed Cup / Billie Jean King Cup and Olympic Games are included in win–loss records.

Singles

Doubles

Notes

Grand Slam finals

Doubles: 6 (2 titles, 4 runner-ups)

Mixed doubles: 1 (1 title)

Other significant finals

Year-end championships

Doubles: 2 (1 title, 1 runner-up)

Premier Mandatory/Premier 5 tournaments

Doubles: 8 (3 titles, 5 runner-ups)

Olympic medal matches

Doubles: 1 final (silver medal)

WTA career finals

Singles: 1 runner-up

Doubles: 50 (27 titles, 23 runner-ups)

ITF Circuit finals

Singles: 17 (8–9)

Doubles: 29 (19–10)

References

External links
 
 
 
 
 
  

1986 births
Living people
Sportspeople from Plzeň
Czech female tennis players
French Open champions
Tennis players at the 2012 Summer Olympics
Tennis players at the 2016 Summer Olympics
Olympic tennis players of the Czech Republic
Olympic medalists in tennis
Olympic silver medalists for the Czech Republic
US Open (tennis) champions
Grand Slam (tennis) champions in mixed doubles
Grand Slam (tennis) champions in women's doubles
Medalists at the 2012 Summer Olympics